Fallen Angels is a 2008 Norwegian film directed by Morten Tyldum. It was nominated for numerous Amanda Awards in 2008. It is the fourth film in the Varg Veum series.

Cast
 Trond Espen Seim as Varg Veum
 Per Kjerstad as Jacob
 Bjørn Floberg as Hamre
 Pia Tjelta as Rebecca
 Fridtjov Såheim as Simon

References

External links
 

2008 films
2008 crime drama films
Films directed by Morten Tyldum
Norwegian crime drama films
Norwegian detective films
Norwegian thriller films
2000s Norwegian-language films